Waller-Bridge is an English double-barrelled surname. It may refer to:
Isobel Waller-Bridge (born 1984), English composer
Phoebe Waller-Bridge (born 1985), English actress, producer, and writer

Compound surnames
English-language surnames
Surnames of English origin